, also known as SBC, is a Japanese broadcast network affiliated with the Japan News Network (JNN) for TV and JRN/NRN for radio. Their headquarters are located in Nagano Prefecture.

The broadcaster was the first radio station outside Japan's five metropolitan prefectures.

Network
 TV: Japan News Network (JNN)
 RADIO: Japan Radio Network (JRN), National Radio Network (NRN)

History
After the establishment of the "Three Radio Laws" (Radio Law, Broadcasting Law, and Radio Supervisory Committee Establishment Law) in 1950, the Shinano Mainichi Shimbun attempted to establish a private broadcasting service.At its first meeting in March 1951, several companies, politicians, and financial institutions elected Shuntaro Katsuta (the then vice president of Shinano Mainichi Shimbun) as the president of Shinano Broadcasting.On October 18 of the same year, they obtained a preparatory broadcast license.

On March 25, 1952 at 5pm, Shinano Broadcasting started to be on air as the first commercial radio broadcaster in the prefecture. Upon its launch, the coverage area was limited to Nagano City, which led to its expanding its coverage area to other cities in Nagano Prefecture between 1953 and 1957. A week later, the company name was changed to Shin-etsu Broadcasting after it receive funding from the local government of Jōetsu City in Niigata Prefecture.

In June 1953, Shin-etsu Broadcasting receive an application for a TV license. Due to the mountainous terrain of Nagano Prefecture, the broadcaster started to build a main transmitter on Mount Utsukushigahara, the first in Japan to have a broadcast transmitter on a mountaintop. On March 14, 1958, it receive a broadcast license. And on October 25, 1958 11:30am, SBC started broadcasting on TV. At that time, it aired programs from TBS and Nippon TV. On March 1, 1959, it also aired programs from Fuji TV and NET (currently known as TV Asahi), the same day the networks started to go on air (Nippon TV, TV Asahi, and Fuji TV programming gradually moved to TV Shinshu, Nagano Broadcasting, and Nagano Asahi Broadcasting when they opened). In August 1959, SBC joined the Japan News Network.

On October 1, 1964, SBC started broadcasting in color on the eve of the 1964 Tokyo Olympics. As part of the 15th anniversary of the broadcaster, they participated in the establishment of Nagano Prefectural Shinano Art Museum on October 1, 1966. In 1979, SBC alongside Minaminihon Broadcasting, Aomori Broadcasting, and Shikoku Broadcasting won the Broadcast Cultural Fund Award.

1 October 2006 Digital terrestrial television was started (Utsukushigahara Main Station, Zenkoji-daira Station, Matsumoto Station, Okaya-Suwa Station, Ina Station and Iida Station).

Stations

Analog TV
 Utsukushigahara (Main Station) JOSR-TV 11ch 1 kW
Sakae-Mura 37ch 10w
Iiyama-Kuwanagawa 56ch 3w
Iiyama 6ch 3w
Iiyama-Narasawa 44ch 0.1w
Iiyama-Atago 56ch 0.1w
Okaya-Kawagishi 50ch 3w
Shirakabako 58ch 1w
Kurumayama 44ch 0.1w
Tatsuno 5ch 3w
Suwa 6ch 75w
Fujimi 32ch 10w
Fujimi-Sezawa 40ch 0.1w
Ina-Nosoko 45ch 0.1w
Takato 12ch 3w
Ina 55ch 100w
Komagane-Nakazawa 56ch 10w
Nakagawa-Kowada 54ch 0.1w
Nakagawa-Tajima 54ch 0.1w
Nagiso 10ch 10w
Iida 6ch 250w
Iida-Achi 55ch 30w
Iida-Kawaji 54ch 3w
Anan 10ch 10w
Anan-Kitajo 58ch 0.1w
Toyama 46ch 10w
Tenryu-Hiraoka 54ch 3w
Shin'no 10ch 3w
Matsumoto 40ch
Zenkoji-daira 48ch

Digital TV(ID:6)
 Utsukushigahara (Main Station) JOSR-DTV 16ch
Iida 36ch
Suwa 51ch
Matsumoto 23ch
Zenkoji-daira 36ch
Ina 23ch

RADIO
 Nagano (Main Station) JOSR 1098 kHz
Matsumoto JOSO 864 kHz; 92.2 MHz FM
Ueda JOSL 1062 kHz
Ina 1098 kHz
Iida JOSW 1098 kHz; 94.2 MHz FM
Suwa JOSE 1197 kHz
Saku 1458 kHz
Karuizawa 1485 kHz
Shiojiri 94.2 MHz FM

Programs

TV 
Shinshu Marugoto Wide Catch! - from 16:54 until 18:55 on Weekdays
Maji Tele - from 13:05 until 14:00 on Saturdays
SBC Special - from 18:55 until 19:54 on Thursdays
Naruhodo! NAGANO - from 19:54 until 19:58 on Mondays
Wonderful Shinshu-jin!! - from 22:54 until 23:00 on Sundays

RADIO
Morning Wide Radio J - from 6:30 until 10:20 on Weekdays
Wakuwaku Wide! Appare Odori - from 11:25 until 15:00 on Weekdays

Rival Stations
Nagano Broadcasting Systems (NBS)
TV. Shinshu (SBC)
Asahi Broadcasting Nagano (abn)

References

External links
 Shin-etsu Broadcasting

Japan News Network
Television stations in Japan
Radio in Japan
Companies based in Nagano Prefecture
1951 establishments in Japan
Mass media in Nagano (city)